René Ballet (1928 – 2 January 2017) was a French journalist, novelist and essayist. A communist, he was an international correspondent for L’Humanité. He was the author of 14 novels and 35 essays, many of which were about Roger Vailland.

Early life
René Ballet was born in 1928 in Saint-Étienne, France. He grew up in Grenoble, where he earned a bachelor of laws from the University of Grenoble.

Ballet joined the French Resistance during World War II.

Career
Ballet joined the French Communist Party in Vanves near Paris in the 1960s. He started his career as a civil servant in Paris in 1961, first in finance and then in national education.

Ballet became a journalist, and he mostly wrote for the automobile press. He also appeared on television as a contributor. He then became the editor-in-chief of Constellation, a Franco-Swiss magazine. From 1971 to 1978, he worked as a communications manager for Fiat S.p.A. He became an international correspondent for L’Humanité, a communist newspaper, and its Sunday newspaper, L’Humanité Dimanche, in 1978.

Ballet was the author of 14 novels and 35 essays. He published his first novel, Echec et Mat, in 1960. His 1986 novel, L'organidrame, was selected for the Prix Goncourt (awarded to Michel Host for Valet de nuit instead). His 1994 novel, L'hôtel des deux gares, was about a collaborationist in Paris during World War II. His 2002 novel, Retour à Santopal, was based on his career as a correspondent under Augusto Pinochet in Chile. Ballet also published research about the works of Roger Vailland. He was also the co-founder and vice-president of the Association Roger Vailland in 1995. Moreover, he served on the editorial board of the Cahiers Roger Vailland.

Ballet was the co-founder of Le Temps des Cerises, a publishing house, in 1993. He was the founding editor-in-chief of La Revue Commune in 1996. He became an honorary citizen of Vanves in 2004.

Personal life and death
Ballet was married to Simone Ballet, a professor of economics and law at Paris Descartes University. They resided between Paris, Nice and La Chapelle-Fortin. They attended the Fête de l'Humanité annually.

Ballet died on 2 January 2017, at the age of 88.

Selected works

Novels

Non-fiction

References

External links 

1928 births
2017 deaths
Writers from Grenoble
Grenoble Alpes University alumni
Communist members of the French Resistance
20th-century French journalists
20th-century French novelists
20th-century French male writers
21st-century French novelists
French male novelists
20th-century French essayists
French Communist Party members